Govindpura is a village in the Badhra tehsil of the Bhiwani district in the Indian state of Haryana.

References

Villages in Bhiwani district